IK-2 can mean:

 Ikarus IK-2, a 1930s Yugoslav fighter aircraft
 Corrective colony No. 2, Vladimir Oblast, a prison in Vladimir Oblast, Russia
 Corrective colony No. 2, Mordovia, a women's prison in Russia